Lawrence Tlou Molekwane (born 2 February 1989) is a retired South African football player, who played as right back.

Club career
Born in Seshego (Limpopo), Molekwane made his debut for Kaizer Chiefs on 8 August 2009 in a 0–0 draw against Santos in the ABSA Premiership. In April 2012, Molekwane broke his foot in training and missed the remainder of the season.

Molekwane moved to Bidvest Wits on a 2-year contract in June 2012. He only made 2 league appearances for the club and was released at the end of the 2012–13 season.

Molekwane joined newly promoted Premier Soccer League team Polokwane City in August 2013.

After two operations without success, Molekwane announced his retirement in August 2019.

References

1989 births
Living people
People from Polokwane Local Municipality
South African soccer players
Kaizer Chiefs F.C. players
Bidvest Wits F.C. players
Polokwane City F.C. players
Bloemfontein Celtic F.C. players
Association football defenders
Sportspeople from Limpopo